Estérel Côte d'Azur Agglomération (before May 2021: Var Estérel Méditerranée) is a communauté d'agglomération, an intercommunal structure, centred on the cities of Fréjus and Saint-Raphaël. It is located in the Var department, in the Provence-Alpes-Côte d'Azur region, southeastern France. It was created in January 2013. Its seat is in Saint-Raphaël. Its population was 112,812 in 2017.

Composition
The communauté d'agglomération consists of the following 5 communes:
Les Adrets-de-l'Estérel
Fréjus
Puget-sur-Argens
Roquebrune-sur-Argens
Saint-Raphaël

References

Esterel Cote d'Azur Agglomeration
Esterel Cote d'Azur Agglomeration